CED may refer to:

Camurati-Engelmann disease, a rare genetic syndrome
The Canadian Eskimo Dog
Capacitance Electronic Disc, a playback-only video medium 
CED (journal)
Classical electrodynamics
Collective Earth Defense from the video game Descent³
The UC Berkeley College of Environmental Design
Collins English Dictionary
Conjugate eye deviation
Convection enhanced delivery, an experimental drug delivery method
Committee for Economic Development
Community economic development
Course and Exam Description, a function of the College Board, Advanced Placement Program
In economics, Cross (price) elasticity of demand
Cumulative Energy Demand is suited to determine and compare the energy intensity of processes
Short form of CygnusEd
Ceduna Airport, IATA airport code "CED"